Rothenburg is a village and a former municipality in the Saalekreis district, Saxony-Anhalt, Germany. Since 1 January 2011, it is part of the town Wettin-Löbejün. The Rothenburg Ferry, a cable ferry, crosses the Saale river at Rothenburg.

References

Former municipalities in Saxony-Anhalt
Wettin-Löbejün